Teashirt zinc finger homeobox 1 is a protein that in humans is encoded by the TSHZ1 gene.

Function 

This gene encodes a colon cancer antigen that was defined by serological analysis of recombinant cDNA expression libraries. The encoded protein is a member of the teashirt C2H2-type zinc-finger protein family and may be involved in transcriptional regulation of developmental processes. Mutations in this gene may be associated with congenital aural atresia syndrome.

In Animal Models 
In addition to humans, orthologous Tshz-family genes are known to exist in several other organisms, including invertebrates like insects. Research using model organisms can be majorly beneficial in exploring the potential functionality of genes that are present in humans without requiring human testing. Additionally, by looking at gene number and function changes between organisms with differing levels of relatedness, it is possible to gain a better understanding of the gene’s phylogeny, or evolutionary history. Findings related to Tshz1 orthologs in model organisms varies in scale and density of research from organism to organism.

In Mice 
Mice are commonly used to study Tshz1 functionality due to their closer relatedness to humans as mammals compared to other common model organisms. However, Tshz1 genes in non-model mammalian organisms have been characterized, or explored in detail, to a limited extent. The Tshz1 ortholog in the Mus musculus mouse model has been implicated in motor neuron development and craniofacial morphogenesis.  Experiments involving whole gene knockout of Tshz1 during development resulted in universal lethality of M. musculus pups shortly after birth, presumably due to soft palate defects and skeletal deformities linked with Tshz1 inactivation. Mutant mice in knockout and loss of function experiments have been observed to be unable to suckle and feed, with their intestines filling up with air shortly after birth and their stomach appearing distended compared to wild type individuals. Investigations into Tshz1 impact on motor neuron development have been limited in scale, however Tshz1 mutant mice have been observed to have difficulties regulating breathing, due to decreased survival of Hypoglossal nerve and phrenic motor neurons during development.

In Zebrafish 
Tshz1 orthologs in Danio rerio have largely yet to be characterized, however experiments using in-situ hybridization to mark gene expression have shown that Tshz1a is most highly expressed in the spinal cord, fore-to-hindbrain, and eye during early development. Consequently, it is suspected that Tshz1a may play a role in neuron development in the brain and visual system, including the retina. Three other Tshz family genes are known to exist in Zebrafish: Tshz2, Tshz3a, and Tshz3b. A fifth gene, Tshz1b, is predicted to exist. Multiple versions of the same gene commonly exist in the Zebrafish genome, referred to as ‘a’ and ‘b’, due to an evolutionary event known as WGD (Whole Genome Duplication) in the ancestral lineage of Teleost fish, which Zebrafish belong to. The potential existence of Tshz1b is therefore contingent on whether or not the Tshz1 ortholog in the Zebrafish ancestor existed prior to the WGD event/events, and if so, whether or not Tshz1b was lost subsequently over time due to chromosome rearrangement.

In Fruit Flies 
Drosophila melanogaster is known to possess one Tshz family gene, commonly referred to as Tsh or T Shirt, and is known to be orthologous to the Tshz gene family in humans and other vertebrates. Tsh has been found to be involved in DNA-binding activity and several aspects of development, including formation of head structures and wing hinge development. Other important processes Tsh is involved in include segmental identity, dorsal/ventral patterning, and development of the compound eye. Additionally, Tsh has been used as a test gene for creating more streamlined methods for determining the position of enhancer elements due to its large ratio of non-coding RNAs. While distantly related to humans, the presence of a Tshz-family gene in D. melanogaster suggests that this gene family originates early in the evolutionary lineage of modern-day organisms, before the divergence of vertebrate and invertebrate eukaryotes. Currently, no non-eukaryotic organisms are known to possess a Tshz-orthologous gene, but several other invertebrates, such as Bactrocera latifrons and Ceratitis capitata have known Tsh orthologs.

References

Further reading 

 
 
 
 
 

Genes on human chromosome 18